Lady Yi of the Jeonju Yi clan or posthumously called as Princess Anui, was a Goryeo-born woman who would eventually become a part of the Joseon Royal Family member as the only daughter of Yi Haengni, from Lady Choe. She was the younger sister of Yi Chun and became the paternal grandaunt of Yi Seonggye, its founder.

In 1392, when Joseon dynasty was established, her parents became formally called as a King (왕, 王; Wang) and Queen (왕비, 王妃; Wangbi) and in 1411, they posthumously honoured as King Ikjo and Queen Jeongsuk. Due to this, she later became a Princess and posthumously honoured as Princess Anui (안의공주, 安懿公主) in 1901 (5th year reign of Emperor Gojong of Korea).

She married Ju-Dan (주단), son of Ju In-hwan (주인환) from the Neungseong Ju clan and bore him a son, Ju Hu (주후). Their descendants continued to live in Yeongheung, Hamgyeong-do, Korea (nowadays Geumya-gun, Hamgyeongnam-do).

References

Goryeo people
Year of birth unknown
Year of death unknown
Date of birth unknown
Date of death unknown
Princesses of Joseon